Christopher Walter McAlpine (born December 1, 1971) is an American former professional hockey player who played in the NHL with the New Jersey Devils, St. Louis Blues, Tampa Bay Lightning, Atlanta Thrashers, Chicago Blackhawks, and Los Angeles Kings. He played defense and shot right-handed.

Playing career
McAlpine was drafted by the New Jersey Devils in the 7th round, 137th overall in the 1990 NHL Entry Draft. After being drafted he played for the University of Minnesota for 4 years, scoring 30 points in 36 games his final year there. He made his debut in the NHL during the 1994–1995 season when he split the year with the Devils and the Albany River Rats of the AHL. After one and a half years with the River Rats McAlpine was traded to the St. Louis Blues, where he played the majority of his NHL career.

The 1999–2000 season turned out to be a hectic one for McAlpine, as he played for the Blues, Tampa Bay Lightning, and Atlanta Thrashers. Following that season he played for the Chicago Blackhwaks for 2 years and then 21 games with the Los Angeles Kings during the 2002–03 season.

McAlpine won the Stanley Cup in 1995 with the New Jersey Devils. He retired after the 2004–05 season playing with the Cincinnati Mighty Ducks of the AHL.  He is currently a player agent working in Minneapolis.

Career statistics

Awards and honors

References

External links

1971 births
Albany River Rats players
American men's ice hockey defensemen
Atlanta Thrashers players
Chicago Blackhawks players
Cincinnati Mighty Ducks players
Detroit Vipers players
Living people
Los Angeles Kings players
Ice hockey players from Minnesota
Manchester Monarchs (AHL) players
Minnesota Golden Gophers men's ice hockey players
New Jersey Devils draft picks
New Jersey Devils players
Norfolk Admirals players
People from Roseville, Minnesota
St. Louis Blues players
Stanley Cup champions
Tampa Bay Lightning players
Worcester IceCats players
Roseville Area High School alumni
AHCA Division I men's ice hockey All-Americans